NGC 4534 is a spiral galaxy, located in the Canes Venatici constellation. It was discovered on May 1, 1785 by William Herschel, using an 18" reflector telescope.

References

External links 
 

4534
Discoveries by William Herschel
Canes Venatici
Dwarf spiral galaxies
041779